The Amiga Assampler is a software synthesizer and sample editor. Its features are:

 interactive graphical assembling of sound processes
 sounds with different sample rate or volume are automatically adjusted
 sound groups allow hierarchical storage and operations on multiple sounds at once
 no limit for multichannel sounds (known as stereo, surround, quadro, octa?)
 hard disk editing of raw non-interleaved sample sounds with no functional limit
 easy creation of control, modulation, waveform etc. curves
 frequency spectrum can be used both for viewing and manipulating
 a rich set of basic processes, e.g.: basics, echo, distortion, filters, FFT
 in principle everything can be run as realtime effect
 parameters can be given as mathematical expressions with complex numbers and SI units
 multithreading, you don't need to wait for a calculation to complete
 fast MC68000 assembly signal routines
 user interface written in Cluster (extended Modula-2)

See also

External links
 

Software synthesizers
Amiga software